Ali Haider (born 28 November 1988) is a Pakistani first-class cricketer who played for Lahore cricket team.

References

External links
 

1988 births
Living people
Pakistani cricketers
Lahore cricketers
Cricketers from Lahore